Amphicyclotulus guadeloupensis was a species of tropical land snail with a gill and an operculum, a terrestrial gastropod mollusk in the family Neocyclotidae.

This species was endemic to Guadeloupe. This land snail is now extinct.

References

Neocyclotidae
Extinct gastropods
Taxonomy articles created by Polbot